The Glasflügel 402 is a German sailplane developed by the glider manufacturer Glasflügel.

Specifications

See also
List of gliders

References

Glasflügel aircraft
1980s German sailplanes
Aircraft first flown in 1981